Glass Casket is a deathcore band from Winston-Salem, North Carolina. Originally known as Gadrel, the band released two albums before becoming mostly inactive in 2006 as the members focused on other projects. In 2013, the band announced that they were working on new music but would not officially reform until a decade later in 2023, announcing that an EP would be released later that year.

History
They were originally called Gadrel when releasing their first demo To Cherish a Falsity. The band formed after several members' previous band Narayan broke up. Dustie Waring and Blake Richardson are also members of Between the Buried and Me, and Adam Cody is a member of metal band Wretched and the grindcore band Columns. Jake Troth, who joined Glass Casket prior to the recording of A Desperate Man's Diary, also played in Columns, but left the band in 2007. 

Guitarist Dustie Waring has stated on Between the Buried and Me's message board that Glass Casket is writing a new record, and were set to be releasing it sometime in 2013, stating it will be more "brutal" than A Desperate Man's Diary. In January 2014, Glass Casket announced Wes Hauch (formerly of The Faceless) as their new guitarist.

On January 17, 2023, Silent Pendulum Records founder and CEO Michael Kadner released a brief video stating that Glass Casket had signed to the label and a new record would be released later year; additionally, Silent Pendulum obtained the rights to We Are Gathered Here Today and Desperate Man's Diary and would be reissuing the albums on vinyl. After a decade in development hell, Glass Casket will release their first new material in 17 years; a self-titled EP to be released on June 9, 2023. The band released the EP's lead single and their first song in 17 years, "Let Them Go", on March 16, 2023.

Members
Current line-up
Adam Cody – lead vocals (2001–present) (Wretched, Columns, ex-Zero System, ex-Anything on Fire, ex-Vanisher, ex-Nysiis, ex-Vehemence)
Dustie Waring – guitars (2001–present) (Between the Buried and Me)
Blake Richardson - drums (2001–present) (Between the Buried and Me)
Sid Menon – bass, clean vocals (2002–present) (ex-Upheld, ex-Yearling)
Wes Hauch – guitars (2014–present) (Alluvial, ex-The Faceless, ex-Black Crown Initiate)

Former members
Ian Blake Tuten – guitars (2001-2006)
Jake Troth – guitars (2006-2013) (ex-Columns, ex-Desist, Seneca)

Timeline

Discography

Studio albums

Extended plays

Music videos

References

American deathcore musical groups
Musical groups established in 2001
Heavy metal musical groups from North Carolina
Musical quintets
Abacus Recordings artists